The women's 4 × 100 metre medley relay event at the 2020 Summer Olympics was held on 30 July and 1 August 2021 at the Tokyo Aquatics Centre. It was the event's sixteenth consecutive appearance, having been held at every edition since 1960.

The medals for the competition were presented by Anita DeFrantz, United States; IOC Vice-President, and the medalists' bouquets were presented by Virendra Nanavati, India; FINA Bureau Member.

Records
Prior to this competition, the existing world and Olympic records were as follows.

The following record was established during the competition:

Qualification

 
The top 12 teams in this event at the 2019 World Aquatics Championships qualified for the Olympics. An additional 4 teams will qualify through having the fastest times at approved qualifying events during the qualifying period (1 March 2019 to 30 May 2020).

Competition format
The competition consists of two rounds: heats and a final. The relay teams with the best 8 times in the heats advance to the final. Swim-offs are used as necessary to break ties for advancement to the next round.

Schedule
All times are Japan Standard Time (UTC+9)

Results

Heats
The relay teams with the top 8 times, regardless of heat, advanced to the final.

Final

References

Women's 4 x 100 metre medley relay
Olympics
Women's events at the 2020 Summer Olympics
2021 in women's swimming